The Ogilvie baronetcy of Barras, Kincardine, Scotland was created in the Baronetage of Nova Scotia on 5 March 1662 for George Ogilvie for his defence of Dunnottar Castle against Cromwell and the preservation of the regalia of Scotland in 1661-62.

Ogilvie baronets of Barras (1662)

 Sir George Ogilvie, 1st Baronet  (died c.1680)
 Sir William Ogilvie, 2nd Baronet (died c.1707)
 Sir David Ogilvie, 3rd Baronet (died c.1740)
 Sir William Ogilvie, 4th Baronet (died 1791)
 Sir David Ogilvie, 5th Baronet (1729–1799)
 Sir George Mulgrave Ogilvie, 6th Baronet (1779–1837)
 Sir William Ogilvie, 7th Baronet (c.1785–c.1840) (Baronetcy dormant on his death)

See also
 Ogilvy baronets
 Ogilvy-Wedderburn baronets

References

External links

Baronetcies in the Baronetage of Nova Scotia
Extinct baronetcies in the Baronetage of Nova Scotia